is a Japanese romantic comedy manga series written and illustrated by Yoshihiro Togashi. It was serialized in the Shueisha magazine Weekly Shōnen Jump from 1989 to 1990. Togashi is best known from his later works YuYu Hakusho and Hunter × Hunter, also serialized in the same publication.

Plot
The storyline of Ten de Shōwaru Cupid follows , a sweet and introverted 15-year-old who lives with his four stepsisters and their father, the leader of the Koinobori yakuza and promiscuous playboy by heritage, just like his own father, grandfather, and so on. Ryuji's family has a tendency to make fun of his innocent nature, causing the boy to continuously try to run away from home. After escaping one day, Ryuji witnesses a beautiful girl with a devil tail bathing in a forest pool. Embarrassed, Ryuji returns to his home only to be confronted by girl the following day. As it turns out, this devil girl named Maria was hired by Ryuji's father to live with them in order to teach his son "the pleasures of the flesh" and make him follow in the family's perverted footsteps.

Production
Ten de Shōwaru Cupid was the first of manga by author Yoshihiro Togashi serialized in the Shueisha magazine Weekly Shōnen Jump. A few years prior to conceiving it, Togashi had created several one shots featured in the same magazine. Togashi produced manuscripts for Ten de Shōwaru Cupid within his Tokyo apartment when it started serialization during the summer of 1989. He began hiring assistants after the first few chapters of the manga's run. Togashi used his weekly messages to fans to recruit assistants by encouraging readers to send in their best work to his Shuiesha editor Toshinaga Takahashi. Togashi's younger brother, another prospective mangaka, would also help out occasionally. Towards the finale of its serialization, Togashi realized that there would not be enough chapters to fill the fourth and final tankōbon volume of manga and that it would be 50 to 100 pages too short. To remedy this, Shueisha included two of his earlier works: Sensē wa Toshishita!! and Jura no Miduki. In the last volume, Togashi also addressed plot holes, such as Ryuyi's middle school age or the fate of the characters Kakisugi and Kitou, by telling fans not to read too deeply into the story.

Years after its conclusion, Togashi has admitted he considers Ten de Shōwaru Cupid a failure and that writing romantic comedy was beyond his capabilities. Having been given an opportunity to serialize his first major work within such a prominent publication, he was embarrassed that he found it so extremely difficult to produce it week after week. In addition, he felt intimidated by many of his more popular contemporaries within Weekly Shōnen Jump and that he was struggling to compete for the reader poll votes necessary to keep the series afloat. He eventually lost his desire to continue Ten de Shōwaru Cupid. After ending it in early 1990, Togashi was anxious and excited to begin working on another manga that better expressed his own interests. This came in the form of the supernatural, fighting manga series Yu Yu Hakusho, which began its serialization late that same year.

Publication
Ten de Shōwaru Cupid was serialized in Shueisha's Weekly Shōnen Jump from its 32nd issue in 1989 to its 13th issue in 1990. The chapters were collected into four tankōbon volumes between January and November 1990. A wide-ban re-release was published in three volumes from March 18 to May 19, 1994. Finally, a bunkoban (pocket) version was published in two volumes on November 15, 2002.

Chapter list

References

External links

Romantic comedy anime and manga
Shōnen manga
Shueisha manga
Yoshihiro Togashi